Paracercomonas is a genus of rhizaria.

It includes the species Paracercomonas marina.

Species
 P. ambulans Howe & Cavalier-Smith 2009
 P. astra Howe & Cavalier-Smith 2009
 P. baikali Howe et al. 2011
 P. bassi Brabender et al. 2012
 P. compacta Bass & Cavalier-Smith 2009
 P. crassicauda (Dujardin 1841) Bass & Cavalier-Smith 2009
 P. ekelundi Cavalier-Smith & Bass 2006
 P. elongata Howe & Cavalier-Smith 2009
 P. filosa Bass & Cavalier-Smith 2009
 P. kruegeri Brabender et al. 2012
 P. marina Cavalier-Smith & Bass 2006
 P. metabolica (Mylnikov 1992) Cavalier-Smith & Bass 2006
 P. minima (Mylnikov 1985) Bass & Cavalier-Smith 2009
 P. oxoniensis Howe & Cavalier-Smith 2009
 P. paralaciniaegerens Bass & Cavalier-Smith 2009
 P. pleomorpha Bass & Cavalier-Smith 2009
 P. proboscata Brabender et al. 2012
 P. producta Howe & Cavalier-Smith 2009
 P. saepenatans Vickerman 2009
 P. tenuis Bass & Cavalier-Smith 2009
 P. virgaria Bass, Mylnikov & Cavalier-Smith 2009
 P. vonderheydeni Bass & Cavalier-Smith 2009

References

Cercozoa genera